Yuya Ishii may refer to

 Yuya Ishii (director), Japanese film director
 Yuya Ishii (baseball), Japanese baseball player